David Richard Kydd (born 22 December 1945) is an English former footballer who played as a wing half.

Career
Kydd began his career in the youth ranks at Brighton & Hove Albion, making his debut for the first team in a Sussex Senior Cup game. On 21 September 1965, Kydd made his debut for Brighton in a 2–1 loss against Ipswich Town in the League Cup, before making his Football League debut against Millwall in a 2–2 home draw four days later. In the summer of 1966, Kydd signed for Chelmsford City. In October 1966, following a recommendation from former Chelmsford player Peter Gillott, Kydd joined Margate. On 29 October 1966, Kydd scored twice on his debut in a 4–0 win against Dunstable Town. In his fourth game for the club, Kydd scored a hat-trick in an 8–0 win against Tunbridge Wells on 12 November 1966. In February 1968, Kydd signed for Dartford.

References

1945 births
Living people
Association football wingers
Association football forwards
English footballers
People from Penge
Brighton & Hove Albion F.C. players
Chelmsford City F.C. players
Margate F.C. players
Dartford F.C. players
English Football League players
Southern Football League players